The Chesham Building Society was a building society based in the market town of Chesham in Buckinghamshire, England which merged with the Skipton Building Society in June 2010. Prior to the merger it was the 37th largest building society in the United Kingdom based on its total assets of £231 million. It was a member of the Building Societies Association.

Their logo was a stylised chess piece, a pun on the name of the River Chess, the local river.

History
Founded in 1845 it was the world's oldest (surviving) building society - many early societies were wound up after all members had a house.

The Society promoted itself as offering a more personal service due to their focus on the locality of their main target customers, including the residents of Chesham, hence the original slogan was "Far better for being near to you".

The Society had branches in Aylesbury, Little Chalfont, an agency in Tring and the branch/head office in Chesham.

Merger with Skipton Building Society
On 24 February 2010 the society announced a proposed merger with the Skipton Building Society. This was approved by Chesham Members at their AGM on 31 March 2010 with just over 80 percent of both savers and borrowers voting in favour. The merger of the two societies took place on 1 June 2010. The enlarged society operates under the Skipton name.

References

External links
 Chesham Building Society (now redirects to Skipton)
 Building Societies Association
 KPMG Building Societies Database 2008

Chesham
Banks established in 1845
Organizations established in 1845
1845 establishments in England
Companies based in Buckinghamshire